Nicaea, Nicea, Nikaea or Nikaia (Greek: [place] of victory) may refer to:

Places 
 Nicaea, an ancient Greek city in northwestern Anatolia
 Empire of Nicaea
 See of Nicaea
 Duke of Nicaea
 İznik
 Nicaea (Locris), a fortress city of the Locri Epicnemidii, Greece
 Nicaea (Corsica), an Etruscan settlement 
 Nicaea (Thrace), a town of ancient Thrace, now in Turkey
 Nicaea, Punjab, city in the Punjab, Pakistan built by Alexander the Great
 Nice, France
 Nikaia, Attica, a suburb of Athens, Greece
 Nikaia, Illyria, an ancient Greek colony in Illyria
 Nikaia, Larissa, a town in the Larissa regional unit, Greece

People 
 Nicaea (mythology), a nymph
 Nicaea of Corinth, wife of Alexander of Corinth
 Nicaea of Macedon (–), daughter of Antipater
 Nicea ( 249 AD), Christian martyr

Other uses 
 Nikaea (moth), a genus of moth

See also 
 Council of Nicaea (disambiguation)